Country Joy is a Canadian soap opera television series which aired on CBC Television from 1979 to 1980.

Premise
This series was produced in Edmonton. Its plot features Dick Brugencate (Howard Dallin), a real estate agent in the fictitious Alberta community of Coronet, lost his wife in an automobile crash. He campaigns to build a modern medical centre for the community believing that this could have prevented his wife's death. In the process, he meets and soon marries medical executive Joy Burnham (Judith Maby). Dick's mother Helen (Vernis McQuaig) and his teenaged children Pam (Debra Au Coin) and Bob (Jim Calderbank) object to his relationship with Joy.

Scheduling
This half-hour series was broadcast on weekdays at 12:30 p.m. (Eastern) from 19 November 1979 to 4 January 1980.

Cast
 Howard Dallin as Dick Brugencate
 Judith Mabey as Joy Burnham
 Debra Au Coin as Pam Brugencate
 Jim Calderbank as Rob Brugencate
 Vernis McQuaig as Helen Brugencate
 Brian Taylor as Andy Mallory
 Wally McSween as John Morgan
 Pamela Boyd
 Jack Wyntars

See also
 High Hopes (1978)

References

External links
 
 

CBC Television original programming
1979 Canadian television series debuts
1980 Canadian television series endings
Canadian television soap operas
1980s Canadian drama television series